Shoreacres is an unincorporated community in the West Kootenay region of southeastern British Columbia. This former ferry landing lies on the northwest shore of the Kootenay River and northeast shore of the Slocan River.

Ferry and road bridges
From 1888, F. Fitzgerald operated a  scow across the mouth of the Slocan. Fitzgerald also ran a small store. Oliver Redpath succeeded him as the ferry operator. On one occasion, a man drowned while attempting to cross on a log.

In 1890, H. Abbott was awarded the charter. That June, after recent repairs, the cable snapped. On rushing downstream, the scow struck a snag, which provided an opportunity for the three passengers to safely reach land. John (Jack) Evans, the operator, unsuccessfully tried to secure the ferry but eventually jumped overboard and swam ashore with great difficulty. Weeks later, Evans resigned to seek a less hazardous job, and the Canadian Pacific Railway (CP), which was then awarded the franchise, installed a new boat. After operating into the fall, the service ceased for the winter, when the scows were rebuilt. The new railway bridge being complete, the ferry did not recommence in the spring. Assumedly, over the next two decades, people used either private boats or the CP bridge to cross the river.

The 1910 public road bridge comprised a  deck span, an adjoining  inverted truss, and trestle-bent approaches. The 1926 bridge comprised  and  Howe truss spans on concrete piers, with a  approach. For the 1962 concrete span, the construction substructure was awarded to Kenyon & Co ($85,500) and the superstructure to the Western Bridge Division of Canadian Iron Foundries ($206,484). In 2018, the bridge underwent a $1.1-million deck resurfacing.

Name origin
The former ferry inspired the original name of Slocan Crossing. By 1892, the Columbia and Kootenay Railway (C&K), a CP subsidiary, adopted the same for the train station. The next year, the name appears on Perry's Mining Map. In the late 1890s, newspaper reports loosely refer to Slocan Junction as Slocan Crossing. Thomas J. Lancaster, who owned the land in the vicinity, had a private siding called Lancaster Spur. Not surprisingly, the settlement became known as Lancaster Spur. The usage of Shoreacres dates at least from 1908. The name describes a distinctive geographical feature, where the river shore surrounds to the south, east, and west. In 1909, CP and the new post office adopted the change, but the new school waited until 1914. When the Doukhobors began buying local land in 1912, they named the community Prekrasnoye (beautiful in Russian) but with the collapse of this movement, this alternative eventually disappeared even among the descendants.

Railway
The northeastward advance of the rail head from Sproat's Landing was almost at the Slocan in September 1890, where progress was halted until the railway bridge was completed a month later. In May 1891, the last spike was driven at Nelson and passenger train service commenced the next month.

The Slocan railway bridge required extensive repairs after being damaged by the 1894 flood. In 1902, a steel bridge was erected, which in turn needed repair when the supports washed out the next year.

In 1908, CP took over the private Lancaster spur.

In 1940, an occupant died, when a vehicle crashed into an eastbound locomotive pulling a caboose at a private crossing near the bridge.

. In 1905, Lancaster Spur became a flag station.

Community
Gallagher's Slocan House hotel operated for a few months in 1892. Prior to the opening of the C&K branch to Slocan City in 1897, the Murray and Matheson pack train was based at the crossing.

A general store existed at least from the 1920s to the 1950s. The post office closed in 1973 and the school in 1985.

In 2012, the Kieran Galbraith Shoreacres Beach Memorial Park was established on the banks of the Slocan. That year, large numbers attended the centennial celebration at what had been a predominantly Doukhobor community. Established in 1912, the Doukhobor cemetery remains in use.

In 2020, the first net zero emissions residence in the Kootenays was built at Shoreacres.

The nearest BC Transit stop is Playmor Junction.

Freedomites
Various incidents linked to the Freedomites:
1940: Fire razed general store.
1946: Fires destroyed Doukhobor community hall and a residence.
1947: Fires consumed dozens of residences.
1949: Attempted arson of CP station.
1950: CP track dynamited.
1953: Fires destroyed two buildings.
1961: Power poles dynamited.
1962: Power pole dynamited and nine residences razed.

Footnotes

References

Settlements in British Columbia
Populated places in the West Kootenay